, later renamed , was the first ironclad warship of the Imperial Japanese Navy. She was designed as an armored ram for service in shallow waters, but also carried three guns. The ship was built in Bordeaux, France, for the Confederate States Navy under the cover name Sphinx, but was sold to Denmark after sales of warships by French builders to the Confederacy was forbidden in 1863. The Danes refused to accept the ship and sold her to the Confederates which commissioned her as CSS Stonewall in 1865. The ship did not reach Confederate waters before the end of the American Civil War in April and was turned over to the United States.

The Tokugawa shogunate of Japan bought her from the United States in 1867 and renamed her Kōtetsu, but delivery was held up by the Americans until after the Imperial faction had established control over most of the country. She was finally delivered in March 1869 to the new government and had a decisive role in the Naval Battle of Hakodate Bay in May, which marked the end of the Boshin War, and the completion of the military phase of the Meiji Restoration.

Renamed Azuma in 1871, she played minor roles in the Saga Rebellion and the Taiwan Expedition, both in 1874. The ship ran aground later that year, but was refloated and repaired. During the Satsuma Rebellion three years later, she was little used. Azuma was stricken in 1888 and was sold for scrap the following year.

Description
The brig's composite hull was sheathed in copper to protect it from parasites and biofouling and it featured a pronounced tumblehome. She displaced  and her crew numbered 135 officers and crewmen. To improve her maneuverability the ship was fitted with twin rudders.

Her main battery consisted of a single 300-pounder   Armstrong rifled muzzle-loading (RML) gun located in the bow turret in a pivot mount. The fixed turret had three or five gun ports. A pair of 70-pounder  Armstrong RML guns were positioned in the oval fixed turret abaft the mainmast, one pivot mount on each broadside firing through two gun ports. The Japanese removed one of the 70-pounder guns and added a pair of Armstrong 6-pounder guns, four 4-pounder field guns and a Gatling gun.

The ship was designed to withstand hits by  guns. The hull armor was  amidships and tapered to  towards the bow and stern. The bow turret was protected with  armor and the amidships turret was fitted with  armor plates.

The power plant consisted of a pair of Mazeline horizontal two-cylinder single-expansion steam engines, each driving a four-bladed,  screw using steam provided by two Mazeline tubular boilers. The ship reached a maximum speed of  during her sea trials on 9 October 1864.

Origins and career
In June 1863, John Slidell, the Confederate commissioner to France, asked Emperor Napoleon III in a private audience if it would be possible for the Confederate government to build ironclad warships in France. Arming ships of war for a recognized belligerent like the Confederate States would have been illegal under French law, but Slidell and his agent, James D. Bulloch, were confident that the Emperor of France would be able to circumvent his own laws more easily than other potential secret contractors. Napoleon III agreed to the building of ironclads in France on the condition that their destination remain a secret. The following month Bulloch entered a contract with Lucien Arman, a French shipbuilder and a personal confidant of Napoleon III, to build a pair of ironclad rams capable of breaking the Union blockade. To avoid suspicion, the ships' guns were manufactured separately from the ship herself and the pair were named Cheops and Sphinx to encourage rumors that they were intended for the Egyptian Navy.

Prior to delivery, however, a shipyard clerk walked into the U.S. Minister's office in Paris and produced documents which revealed that Arman had fraudulently obtained authorization to arm the ships and was in contact with Confederate agents. The French government blocked the sale under pressure from the United States, but Arman was able to sell the ships to Denmark and Prussia, which were then fighting on opposite sides of the Second Schleswig War.

Manned by a Danish crew, the ship left Bordeaux for its shakedown cruise on 21 June 1864. The crew tested the vessel while final negotiations were being conducted between the Danish Naval Ministry and Arman. Intense haggling over the final price and a disagreement over compensation from the company for cited problems and late delivery led to negotiations breaking down on 30 October, although the ship had set sail for Copenhagen, Denmark, on 25 October. The Danish government refused to relinquish the vessel, claiming confusion in regards to the negotiations. She arrived in Copenhagen on 10 November and was in the  dockyard at the beginning of 1865.

American career

At the beginning of 1865 the Danes sold the ship to the Confederacy. On 6 January the vessel took aboard a Confederate States Navy crew at Copenhagen under the command of Lieutenant Thomas Jefferson Page, although the ship was still commanded by a Danish captain when she put to sea the following day. Heavy weather forced the ship to take refuge at Elsinore, but she set sail shortly afterward for the French coast. She also used the cover name Olinde during this time. During this time she was commissioned CSS Stonewall while still at sea and Page assumed command of the ship. High seas in the Bay of Biscay damaged her rudders while en route for the island of Madeira, Portugal, and forced the ship to seek refuge in Ferrol, Spain. Permanent repairs took several months and provided time for the Union to be notified of the ship's location.

In February and March, the Union steam frigate  and steam sloop  kept watch from a distance as Stonewall lay anchored off A Coruña, waiting for Stonewall to finish her repairs. On 24 March Page put to sea, prepared to engage them, but the unarmored Union ships declined to fight. Stonewall steamed for Lisbon, Portugal, to re-coal, intending to cross the Atlantic Ocean from there. Stonewall reached Nassau, Bahamas, on 6 May and then sailed on to Havana, Cuba, where Page learned of the war's end when he arrived five days later.

Page decided to turn Stonewall over to the Spanish Captain General of Cuba for the sum of $16,000 to pay the crew's wages. The vessel would then be turned over to United States representatives in return for reimbursement of the same amount. The Americans did not pay until 2 November and Stonewall required some repairs before she could put to sea again. While sailing through Chesapeake Bay on the night of 22/23 November, Stonewall accidentally rammed and sank a coal schooner off Smith Island, Maryland; there were no deaths. She was subsequently paid off and laid up at the Washington Navy Yard.

Japanese career

Seeking to reinforce its fleet with modern warships, the Tokugawa shogunate sent representatives to the United States in 1867, seeking to purchase surplus ships.
Acting envoy to the United States Ono Tomogoro discovered Stonewall in the Washington Navy Yard in May and made a formal offer to the United States government for the purchase of the ironclad. The purchase was concluded for the price of $400,000 and she was turned over to the Japanese on 5 August who renamed her Kōtetsu. However, by the time of her arrival in Shinagawa harbor on 22 January 1868, the Boshin War between the shogunate and pro-Imperial forces had begun, and the United States took a neutral stance, stopping the delivery of military material, including the delivery of Kōtetsu, to the Shogunate. The ship had arrived under a Japanese flag with an American crew, but the US Resident-Minister, Robert B. Van Valkenburg, ordered her put back under the American flag. Kōtetsu was finally delivered to the new Meiji government in early March 1869.

Boshin War

Before Kōtetsu was turned over to the Japanese, Tokugawa admiral Enomoto Takeaki refused to surrender his warships after the surrender of Edo Castle to the new government, and escaped to Hakodate in Hokkaido with the remainder of the Tokugawa Navy and a handful of French military advisers and their leader Jules Brunet. His fleet of eight steam warships was the strongest in Japan at the time. On 27 January 1869, Tokugawa loyalists declared the foundation of the Republic of Ezo and elected Enomoto as president. The Meiji government refused to accept partition of Japan and dispatched its newly formed Imperial Japanese Navy, which consisted of Kōtetsu as the flagship and a collection of various steam-powered warships that had been contributed by the various feudal domains loyal to the new government. On 25 March 1869, during the Battle of Miyako Bay, Kōtetsu successfully repulsed a surprise night attempt at naval boarding by the rebel  (spearheaded by survivors from the Shinsengumi), making use of a mounted Gatling gun. Kōtetsu subsequently supported the invasion of Hokkaidō and various naval engagements in the Naval Battle of Hakodate Bay.

Subsequent career
Following the end of the Boshin War in August 1870, Kōtetsu was classified as a third-class warship on 15 November 1871 and was renamed Azuma on 7 December. By January 1873, her fighting ability was assessed as low. Azuma was assigned to guard Nagasaki during the Saga rebellion in February 1874 and during the Taiwan Expedition of May 1874. On 19 August she ran aground at Kagoshima during a typhoon, but was refloated and repaired at the Yokosuka Naval Arsenal. During the Satsuma Rebellion of 1877, she was assigned to guard duties in the Seto Inland Sea. She was stricken from the navy list on 28 January 1888, and was sold for scrap on 12 December 1889. Her armor plating was reused to make the armature shafts in the electric generators in the Asakusa Thermal Power Station, built in Tokyo in 1895.

See also
French weapons in the American Civil War

Notes

Citations

Bibliography

Further reading
 End of the Bakufu and Restoration in Hakodate 函館の幕末・維新 (Japanese). .

External links

 CSS Stonewall (1865) Photos and engravings at sea, anchor, one possibly as Azuma
 CSS Stonewall (1865) At Washington, D.C., 1865-1867 Photos at Washington Navy Yard
 C.S.S. Stonewall History and photos, including one colorized as Azuma
 FS Sphynx / CSS Stonewall Ocean-Going Ironclad Ram (1864) History and photos

Ironclad warships of the Imperial Japanese Navy
Stonewall
Ships built in France
1864 ships
Naval ships of Japan
Ships built by Arman Brothers
Maritime incidents in August 1874